Ivonne Kraft (born 8 July 1970) is a German former cyclist. She competed in the women's cross-country mountain biking event at the 2004 Summer Olympics.

References

External links
 

1970 births
Living people
German female cyclists
Olympic cyclists of Germany
Cyclists at the 2004 Summer Olympics
Sportspeople from Karlsruhe
German mountain bikers
Cyclists from Baden-Württemberg
21st-century German women